Sabaean, also known as Sabaic, was an Old South Arabian language spoken between c. 1000 BC and the 6th century AD, by the Sabaeans. It was used as a written language by some other peoples of the ancient civilization of South Arabia, including the Ḥimyarites, Ḥashidites, Ṣirwāḥites, Humlanites, Ghaymānites, and Radmānites. The Sabaean language belongs to the South Arabian Semitic branch of the Afroasiatic language family. Sabaean is distinguished from the other members of the Old South Arabian group by the use of h to mark the third person, and as a causative prefix; the other languages all use s1 in these cases; Sabaean is therefore called an h-language, and the others s-languages.

Script 
Sabaean was written in the South Arabian alphabet, and like Hebrew and Arabic marked only consonants, the only indication of vowels being with matres lectionis. For many years the only texts discovered were inscriptions in the formal Masnad script (Sabaean ms3nd), but in 1973 documents in another minuscule and cursive script were discovered, dating back to the second half of the 1st century BC; only a few of the latter have so far been published.

The South Arabic alphabet used in Yemen, Eritrea, Djibouti, and Ethiopia beginning in the 8th century BC, in all three locations, later evolved into the Ge'ez alphabet. The Ge'ez language however is no longer considered to be a descendant of Sabaean or of Old South Arabian; and there is linguistic evidence that Semitic languages were in use and being spoken in Eritrea and Ethiopia as early as 2000 BC.

Sabaean is attested in some 1,040 dedicatory inscriptions, 850 building inscriptions, 200 legal texts, and 1300 short graffiti (containing only personal names). No literary texts of any length have yet been brought to light. This paucity of source material and the limited forms of the inscriptions has made it difficult to get a complete picture of Sabaean grammar. Thousands of inscriptions written in a cursive script (called Zabur) incised into wooden sticks have been found and date to the Middle Sabaean period; these represent letters and legal documents and as such includes a much wider variety of grammatical forms.

Varieties 

 Sabaean: the language of the kingdom of Saba and later also of Ḥimyar; also documented in the kingdom of Da'amot; very well documented, c. 6000 inscriptions
 Old Sabaean: mostly boustrophedon inscriptions from the 9th until the 8th century BC and including further texts in the next two centuries from Ma'rib and the Highlands.
 Middle Sabaean: 3rd century BC until the end of the 3rd century AD. The best-documented language. The largest corpus of texts from this period comes from the Awwam Temple (otherwise known as Maḥrem Bilqīs) in Ma'rib.
 Amiritic/Ḥaramitic: the language of the area to the north of Ma'īn
 Central Sabaean: the language of the inscriptions from the Sabaean heartland
 South Sabaean: the language of the inscriptions from Radmān and Ḥimyar
 "Pseudo-Sabaean": the literary language of Arabian tribes in Najrān, Ḥaram and Qaryat al-Fāw
 Late Sabaean: 4th–6th centuries AD. This is the monotheistic period when Christianity and Judaism brought Aramaic and Greek influences.

In the Late Sabaean period the ancient names of the gods are no longer mentioned and only one deity Raḥmānān is referred to. The last known inscription in Sabaean dates from 554 or 559 AD. The language's eventual extinction was brought about by the later rapid expansion of Islam, bringing with it Northern Arabic or Muḍarī, which became the language of culture and writing, totally supplanting Sabaean.

The dialect used in the western Yemeni highlands, known as Central Sabaean, is very homogeneous and generally used as the language of the inscriptions. Divergent dialects are usually found in the area surrounding the Central Highlands, such as the important dialect of the city of Ḥaram in the eastern al-Jawf. Inscriptions in the Ḥaramic dialect, which is heavily influenced by North Arabic, are also generally considered a form of Sabaean. The Himyarites, whose spoken language was Semitic but not South Arabic, used Sabaean as a written language.

Phonology

Vowels 

Since Sabaean is written in an abjad script leaving vowels unmarked, little can be said for certain about the vocalic system. However, based on other Semitic languages, it is generally presumed that it had at least the vowels a, i, and u, which would have occurred both short and long ā, ī, and ū. In Old Sabaean, the long vowels ū and ī are sometimes indicated using the letters for w and y as matres lectionis. In the Old period this is used mainly in word-final position, but in Middle and Late Sabaean it also commonly occurs medially. Sabaean has no way of writing the long vowel ā, but in later inscriptions, in the Radmanite dialect the letter h is sometimes infixed in plurals where it is not etymologically expected: thus bnhy (sons of; Constructive State) instead of the usual bny; it is suspected that this infix represents the vowel ā. Long vowels ū and ī certainly seem to be indicated in forms such as the personal pronouns hmw (them), the verbal form ykwn (also written without the glide ykn; he will be), and in enclitic particles -mw, and -my probably used for emphasis.

Diphthongs 
In the Old Sabaean inscriptions the Proto-Semitic diphthongs aw and ay seemed to have been retained, being written with the letters w and y; in the later stages the same words are increasingly found without these letters, which leads some scholars (such as Stein) to the conclusion that they had by then contracted to ō and ē (though aw → ū and ay → ī would also be possible)

Consonants 
Sabaean, like Proto-Semitic, contains three sibilant phonemes, represented by distinct letters; the exact phonetic nature of these sounds is still uncertain. In the early days of Sabaean studies, Old South Arabian was transcribed using Hebrew letters. The transcriptions of the alveolars or postvelar fricatives remained controversial; after a great deal of uncertainty in the initial period the lead was taken by the transcription chosen by Nikolaus Rhodokanakis and others for the Corpus Inscriptionum Semiticarum (s, š, and ś), until A. F. L. Beeston proposed replacing this with the representation with s followed by the subscripts 1–3. This latest version has largely taken over the English-speaking world, while in the German-speaking area, for example, the older transcription signs, which are also given in the table below, are more widespread. They were transcribed by Beeston as s1, s2, and s3. Bearing in mind the latest reconstructions of the Proto-Semitic sibilants, we can postulate that s1 was probably pronounced as a simple [s]or [ʃ], s2 was probably a lateral fricative [ɬ], and s3 may have been realized as an affricate [t͡s]. The difference between the three sounds is maintained throughout Old Sabaean and Middle Sabaean, but in the Late period s1 and s3 merge. The subscript n did not start appearing until after the Early Sabaic period. The Middle Sabaean Haramitic dialect often shows the change s3 > s1, for example: ˀks1wt ("clothes"), normal Sabaean ks3wy.

The exact nature of the emphatic consonants q, ṣ, ṭ, ẓ and ḑ also remains a matter for debate: were they pharyngealized as in Modern Arabic, or were they glottalized as in Ethiopic (and reconstructed Proto-Semitic)? There are arguments to support both possibilities. In any case, beginning with Middle Sabaean the letters representing ṣ and ẓ are increasingly interchanged, which seems to indicate that they have fallen together as one phoneme. The existence of bilabial fricative f as a reflex of the Proto-Semitic *p is partly proved by Latin transcriptions of names. In late Sabaean ḏ and z also merge.In Old Sabaean the sound n only occasionally assimilates to a following consonant, but in the later periods this assimilation is the norm. The minuscule Zabūr script does not seem to have a letter that represents the sound ẓ, and replaces it with ḑ instead; for example: mfḑr ("a measure of capacity"), written in the Musnad script as: mfẓr.

Sabaean consonants

Grammar

Personal pronouns 
As in other Semitic languages Sabaean had both independent pronouns and pronominal suffixes. The attested pronouns, along with suffixes from Qatabanian and Hadramautic are as follows:

No independent pronouns have been identified in any of the other South Arabian languages. First- and second-person independent pronouns are rarely attested in the monumental inscription, but possibly for cultural reasons; the likelihood was that these texts were neither composed nor written by the one who commissioned them: hence they use third-person pronouns to refer to the one who is paying for the building and dedication or whatever. The use of the pronouns in Sabaean corresponds to that in other Semitic languages. The pronominal suffixes are added to verbs and prepositions to denote the object; thus: qtl-hmw "he killed them"; ḫmr-hmy t'lb "Ta'lab poured for them both"; when the suffixes are added to nouns they indicate possession: bd-hw "his slave").The independent pronouns serve as the subject of nominal and verbal sentences: mr' 't "you are the Lord" (a nominal sentence); hmw f-ḥmdw "they thanked" (a verbal sentence).

 Nouns 

 Case, number and gender 
Old South Arabian nouns fall into two genders: masculine and feminine. The feminine is usually indicated in the singular by the ending –t : bʿl "husband" (m.), bʿlt "wife" (f.), hgr "city" (m.), fnwt "canal" (f.). Sabaean nouns have forms for singular, dual and plural. The singular is formed without changing the stem, the plural can however be formed in a number of ways even in the very same word:
 Inner ("Broken") Plurals: as in Classical Arabic they are frequent.
 ʾ-Prefix: ʾbyt "houses" from byt "house"
 t-Suffix: especially frequent in words having the m-prefix: mḥfdt "towers" from mḥfd "tower".
 Combinations: for example ʾ–prefix and t-suffix: ʾḫrft "years" from ḫrf "year", ʾbytt "houses" from byt "house".
 without any external grammatical sign: fnw "canals" from fnwt (f.) "canal".
 w-/y-Infix: ḫrwf / ḫryf / ḫryft "years" from ḫrf "year".
 Reduplicational plurals are rarely attested in Sabaean: ʾlʾlt "gods" fromʾl "god".
 External ("Sound") plurals: in the masculine the ending differs according to the grammatical state (see below); in the feminine the ending is -(h)t, which probably represents *-āt ; this plural is rare and seems to be restricted to a few nouns.
The dual is already beginning to disappear in Old Sabaean; its endings vary according to the grammatical state: ḫrf-n "two years" (indeterminate state) from ḫrf "year".

Sabaean almost certainly had a case system formed by vocalic endings, but since vowels were involved they are not recognizable in the writings; nevertheless a few traces have been retained in the written texts, above all in the construct state.

 Grammatical states 
As in other Semitic languages Sabaean has a few grammatical states, which are indicated by various different endings according to the gender and the number. At the same time external plurals and duals have their own endings for grammatical state, while inner plurals are treated like singulars. Apart from the construct state known in other Semitic languages, there is also an indeterminate state and a determinate state, the functions of which are explained below. The following are the detailed state endings:

The three grammatical states have distinct syntactical and semantic functions:
 The Status indeterminatus: marks an indefinite, unspecified thing : ṣlm-m "any statue".
 The Status determinatus: marks a specific noun: ṣlm-n "the statue".
 The Status constructus: is introduced if the noun is bound to a genitive, a personal suffix or — contrary to other Semitic languages — with a relative sentence:
 With a pronominal suffix: ʿbd-hw "his slave".
 With a genitive noun: (Ḥaḑramite) gnʾhy myfʾt "both walls of Maifa'at", mlky s1bʾ "both kings of Saba"
 With a relative sentence: kl 1 s1bʾt 2 w-ḍbyʾ 3 w-tqdmt 4 s1bʾy5 w-ḍbʾ6 tqdmn7 mrʾy-hmw8 "all1 expeditions2, battles3 and raids4, their two lords 8 conducted5, struck6 and led7" (the nouns in the construct state are italicized here).

 Verbs 

 Conjugation 
As in other West Semitic languages Sabaean distinguishes between two types of finite verb forms: the perfect which is conjugated with suffixes and the imperfect which is conjugated with both prefixes and suffixes. In the imperfect two forms can be distinguished: a short form and a form constructed using the n (long form esp. the n-imperfect), which in any case is missing in Qatabānian and Ḥaḑramite. In actual use it is hard to distinguish the two imperfect forms from each other. The conjugation of the perfect and imperfect may be summarized as follows (the active and the passive are not distinguished in their consonantal written form; the verbal example is fʿl "to do"):

 Perfect 
The perfect is mainly used to describe something that took place in the past, only before conditional phrases and in relative phrases with a conditional connotation does it describe an action in the present, as in Classical Arabic. For example:  w-s3ḫly Hlkʾmr w-ḥmʿṯt "And Hlkʾmr and ḥmʿṯt have pleaded guilty (dual)".

 Imperfect 
The imperfect usually expresses that something has occurred at the same time as an event previously mentioned, or it may simply express the present or future. Four moods can be distinguished:
 Indicative: in Sabaean this has no special marker, though it has in some of the other languages: b-y-s2ṭ "he trades" (Qatabānian). With the meaning of the perfect: w-y-qr zydʾl b-wrḫh ḥtḥr "Zaid'il died in the month of Hathor" (Minaean).
 Precative is formed with l- and expresses wishes: w-l-y-ḫmrn-hw ʾlmqhw "may Almaqahu grant him".
 Jussive is also formed with l- and stands for an indirect order: l-yʾt "so should it come".
 Vetitive is formed with the negative ʾl". It serves to express negative wishes: w-ʾl y-hwfd''' ʿlbm "and no ʿilb-trees may be planted here“.

Imperative 
The imperative is found in texts written in the zabūr script on wooden sticks, and has the form fˁl(-n). For example: w-'nt f-s3ḫln ("and you (sg.) look after").

Derived stems 
By changing the consonantal roots of verbs they can produce various derivational forms, which change their meaning. In Sabaean (and other Old South Arabian languages) six such stems are attested. Examples:
 qny "to receive" > hqny "to sacrifice; to donate"
 qwm "to decree" > hqm "to decree", tqwmw "to bear witness"

Syntax

Position of clauses 
The arrangement of clauses is not consistent in Sabaean. The first clause in an inscription always has the order (particle - ) subject – predicate (SV), the other main clauses of an inscription are introduced by w- "and" and always have – like subordinate clauses – the order predicate – subject (VS). At the same time the Predicate may be introduced by f.

Examples:

Subordinate clauses 
Sabaean is equipped with a number of means to form subordinate clauses using various conjunctions:

Relative clauses 
In Sabaean, relative clauses are marked by a Relativiser like ḏ-, ʾl, mn-; in free relative clauses this marking is obligatory. Unlike other Semitic languages in Sabaean resumptive pronouns are only rarely found.

Vocabulary 
Although the Sabaean vocabulary is found in relatively diverse types of inscriptions (an example being that the south Semitic tribes derive their word wtb meaning "to sit" from the northwest tribe's word yashab/wtb meaning "to jump"), nevertheless it stands relatively isolated in the Semitic realm, something that makes it more difficult to analyze. Even given the existence of closely related languages such as Ge'ez and Classical Arabic, only part of the Sabaean vocabulary has proved able to be interpreted; a not inconsiderable part must be deduced from the context and some words remain incomprehensible. On the other hand, many words from agriculture and irrigation technology have been retrieved from the works of Yemeni scholars of the Middle Ages and partially also from the modern Yemeni dialects. Foreign loanwords are rare in Sabaean, a few Greek and Aramaic words are found in the Rahmanistic, Christian and Jewish period (5th–7th centuries AD) for example: qls1-n from the Greek ἐκκλησία "church", which still survives in the Arabic al-Qillīs referring to the church built by Abrahah in Sana'a.

See also 
 Old South Arabian
 South Arabian Alphabet
 Himyaritic language
 Undeciphered -k language of ancient Yemen
 Ge'ez
 Kingdom of Aksum
 Sabaeans
 Himyarite Kingdom
 Sheba
 Eduard Glaser
 Carl Rathjens
 Joseph Halévy
 Walter W. Müller

References

Bibliography 
 A. F. L. Beeston: Sabaic Grammar, Manchester 1984 .

 N. Nebes, P. Stein: "Ancient South Arabian", in: Roger D. Woodard (Hrsg.): The Cambridge Encyclopedia of the World's Ancient Languages (Cambridge University Press, Cambridge 2004)  S. 454–487 (up to date) grammatical sketch with Bibliography).
 Maria Höfner: Altsüdarabische Grammatik (Porta linguarum Orientalium, Band 24) Leipzig, 1943
 A.F.L. Beeston, M.A. Ghul, W.W. Müller, J. Ryckmans: Sabaic Dictionary / Dictionnaire sabéen /al-Muʿdscham as-Sabaʾī (Englisch-Französisch-Arabisch) Louvain-la-Neuve, 1982 
 Joan Copeland Biella: Dictionary of Old South Arabic. Sabaean dialect Eisenbrauns, 1982 
 Jacques Ryckmans, Walter W. Müller, Yusuf M. Abdallah: Textes du Yémen antique. Inscrits sur bois (Publications de l'Institut Orientaliste de Louvain 43). Institut Orientaliste, Louvain 1994. 
 Peter Stein: Die altsüdarabischen Minuskelinschriften auf Holzstäbchen aus der Bayerischen Staatsbibliothek in München 1: Die Inschriften der mittel- und spätsabäischen Periode (Epigraphische Forschungen auf der Arabischen Halbinsel 5). Tübingen u.a. 2010. 
 Sabaic Online Dictionary

External links 
 Az Abraha' felirat. Inscription in the Smithsonian National Museum of Natural History. Images, Transcription and Translation into English.
 Wiki Commons: Old South Arabian
 Corpus of South Arabian Inscriptions (Work is still in progress on Sabaean, referred to as Sabaic there.)

Languages attested from the 8th century BC
Old South Arabian languages
Extinct languages of Asia
Language